Matthias Johannes Franciscus Aulike (29 May 1807, Münster - 22 October 1865, Munich) was a civil servant, politician and benefactor of the Kingdom of Prussia.

Kingdom of Prussia
1807 births
1865 deaths
People from Münster
Members of the Frankfurt Parliament